Vladislav Gavriliuc (born 7 March 1972 in Mohyliv-Podilskyi) is a retired Moldovan footballer who played as striker. He played for FC Nistru Otaci between 1992 and 1994 and FC Zimbru Chişinău between 1994 and 2002. Gavriliuc was the Moldovan National Division top scorer in successive years in the 1994-95 season scoring 20 goals, and in the 1995-96 season scoring 34 goals. Vladislav Gavriliuc was capped internationally by Moldova between 1995 and 1996 earning four caps.

Honours
Moldovan National Division (5): 1995, 1996, 1998, 1999, 2000
Moldovan Cup (2): 1997, 1998

Individual
Divizia Națională Top Scorer (2): 1994-1995, 1995-1996

External links
 

1972 births
Living people
Moldovan footballers
Moldovan people of Ukrainian descent
Moldovan Super Liga players
FC Nistru Otaci players
FC Zimbru Chișinău players
People from Mohyliv-Podilskyi
Ukrainian emigrants to Moldova
Moldova international footballers
Association football forwards